Jonas Liaučius (born 15 January 1947) is a Lithuanian politician.  In 1990 he was among those who signed the Act of the Re-Establishment of the State of Lithuania.

References

1947 births
Living people
Lithuanian politicians
Lawyers from Vilnius
20th-century Lithuanian lawyers
21st-century Lithuanian lawyers